Egg and chips, also known as chips and egg is a popular dish in the United Kingdom, consisting simply of chips served with fried eggs.

Associations
Egg and chips became popular in Britain during World War I due to a shortage of meat. It was a favourite food of Tommies behind the lines on the Western Front in northern France and Belgium, eaten at makeshift shops called "estaminet" alongside cheap wine and beer.

Egg and chips is associated with a working-class diet. In an article on moving from the working class to the middle class, a British journalist recounted that "There are things I grew up with that I still love—pub life, darts, egg and chips". Jack Charlton, after playing in the World Cup-winning England football team in 1966, remarked: "We stopped the car for egg and chips in a transport cafe. We'd eaten nothing but the best food for weeks and I was dying for some ordinary grub." The image of British people insisting on ordering egg and chips while on holiday abroad has also been used as a stereotype.

Health
In a study on the perceptions of social inequality of people in North West England, "Beer, fags, egg and chips" was highlighted by the researchers as an example of individual behaviour thought to be connected to poor health.

Reception
Food writer Mary Cadogan says that "Egg and chips for me is a marriage made in heaven. Whenever I feel the need of a bit of comfort eating this is the dish I usually turn to." Heston Blumenthal, owner of the Michelin star award-winning Fat Duck restaurant in Berkshire, wrote in The Guardian that "You can't get much more British a dish than fried egg and chips."

In popular culture
The dish features in art as well as in real life. Egg and chips occupies a pivotal moment in the suffocating life of a working-class Liverpool housewife in Shirley Valentine. "Because it's Thursday, Shirley knows that Joe expects steak and chips for his tea. He is getting egg and chips instead... But Joe ... is not pleased at his meatless meal. He pushes his plate into her lap. That settles it. Two weeks later he comes home and finds an empty house."

The dish's status as a cornerstone of authentic British cuisine is solidified by its regular inclusion in modern popular culture. It features regularly in television depictions of British life, such as the long-running soap series Coronation Street, where it constitutes part of recurring character Johnny "Doc" Docherty's infamous catch phrase, "You've just had your tea, Lesley - Egg and Chips!"

See also
Cafe (British)
Full breakfast
Breakfast sandwich

References

British cuisine
French cuisine
Belgian cuisine
Egg dishes
Fast food